Mikkel Beckmann (born 24 October 1983) is a Danish retired professional footballer who played as a forward. He is the assistant coach of Lyngby BK.

Club career
Beckmann started his professional career when he signed with Lyngby BK in 2004. The high point of his time in Lyngby was the promotion into the Danish Superliga in the 2007–08 season. As one of Lyngby's hot prospects he and Kim Aabech, another highly touted player, are often referred to as "Aabeckman" by Lyngby fans. Despite Beckmanns personal success he was unable to stop Lyngby from being relegated to the Danish 1st Division in 2008. Beckmann played 105 matches for the club and scored 20 goals until the summer 2008. He was particularly renowned at Lyngby for his ability to handle icy playing conditions, often being brought on as a substitute immediately following a break in play due to heavy snow.

On 31 August 2008, Beckmann signed a four-year-long contract with Danish club Randers FC. Beckmann got his debut against AC Horsens on 14 September, the game ended 1–1. However, Beckmann found himself sidelined after suffering from a knee injury which kept him out for the following five matches. He made his return against AC Horsens on 16 November coming on as a sub in the second half. When the winter break arrived Beckmann had created three assist in five matches. Beckmann spoke of his desire to show his full potential after the winter break after having his match appearances reduced by an injury. In his second season at the club, Beckmann established himself in the starting line-up. Randers were in shared last place at the winter break, 13 points below the relegation line, but in the spring season 2010, Beckmann scored seven goals in 15 games, as Randers made a sensational comeback and stayed in the Superliga.

F.C. Nordsjælland
The following 2010–11 season, Randers were relegated to the 1st Division, which resulted in Beckmann being sold to Danish Cup winners FC Nordsjælland for a reported fee of 1,000,000 Danish kroner, where Beckmann signed a three contract with the Farum club and was given the number 10 shirt. The next season, he helped FC Nordsjælland to win the 2011–12 Danish Superliga and reach the group stages of the 2012–13 UEFA Champions League, scoring a goal in FC Nordsjælland's 1–1 home draw against Juventus F.C.

APOEL
He scored his first goal with APOEL on 3 March 2013, in a league match against AEK Larnaca, netting the game's only goal with long-range effort in the 75th minute. At the end of the season, APOEL won the 2012–13 Cypriot First Division and Beckmann became a champion for a second consecutive season. Unexpectedly, and although he still had a two-year contract with APOEL, on 11 July 2013 his contract with the club was mutually terminated.

IF Elfsborg
On 8 August 2013, it was announced that Beckmann joined IF Elfsborg on a 3.5-year contract as a free-agent, after he mutually terminated his contract with APOEL. He shortly arrived to Elfsborg replacing the former striker David Elm who signed for Kalmar FF, taking over his shirt-number 10.

International career
While at Lyngby, Beckmann was called up for the Denmark U21 national team in August 2004, but did not get to play.

Having helped Lyngby to the Superliga, Beckmann was called up as a replacement by Denmark national team manager Morten Olsen for a series of unofficial games in January 2008. He made an impression, and Olsen included him in the squad later that month, in order to further test Beckmann's international level. He made his debut in a February 2008 friendly match 2–1 win against Slovenia, and also played in the subsequent friendly against the Czech Republic, a 1–1 draw. He was a part of the Danish squad until June 2008, but did not play any further games.

In May 2010, he was included in Olsen's preliminary 30-man selection for the 2010 FIFA World Cup, and was subsequently chosen for the final 23-player squad. Olsen had been impressed with his form for Randers in the spring season 2010, while the inclusion came as a surprise to Beckmann himself.

6 December 2011, Beckmann was called up for Denmark's tour of Thailand in January.

Retirement
On 22 November 2015, Beckmann announced on live TV, that he would retire from professional football, because he had too much pain due to several injuries.

Coaching career
On 9 January 2019, Beckmann was announced as the new assistant coach of Lyngby BK.

Honours
FC Nordsjælland
Danish Superliga: 2011–12

APOEL
Cypriot First Division: 2012–13

References

External links

Complete League statistics at danskfodbold.com 

1983 births
Living people
People from Lyngby-Taarbæk Municipality
Danish men's footballers
Association football forwards
Denmark international footballers
2010 FIFA World Cup players
Danish Superliga players
Cypriot First Division players
Allsvenskan players
Brønshøj Boldklub players
Lyngby Boldklub players
Randers FC players
FC Nordsjælland players
APOEL FC players
IF Elfsborg players
Hobro IK players
Danish expatriate men's footballers
Danish expatriate sportspeople in Cyprus
Expatriate footballers in Cyprus
Danish expatriate sportspeople in Sweden
Expatriate footballers in Sweden
Sportspeople from the Capital Region of Denmark